Pantheon is a 2017 French short film directed by Ange-Régis Hounkpatin and produced by Myrina Mané for TS Productions. The film stars William Edimo in the lead role along with Bass Dhem, Sophia Elisabeth and Hugo Marí. The film rotates around Saloman, a 35 years old taxi driver who is a son of a Beninese immigrant.

The film had its premier on 22 June 2017 at Palm Springs International Film Festival, USA. The film received critical acclaim and was officially selected to screen at The African Film Festival 2017, the Atlanta Film Festival 2018 and the Filmfest Dresden 2018. The film won the Bridging the Borders Award at the Palm Springs International Festival of Short Films 2017. In the same year, the film received Honorable Mention at Kolkata International Film Festival.

Cast
 William Edimo	as Saloman 	
 Bass Dhem	as Elias	
 Sophia Elisabeth as Melanie CIA Agent
 Hugo Marí as Oba

References

External links
 
 Pantheon  in Vimeo

2017 films
French short films
2017 short films
2010s French films